Hagar Finer (born 1984) is an Israeli boxer. She is the WIBF bantamweight champion 2009.

Biography
Hagar Finer was born in Tel Aviv, Israel, on October 15, 1984. She took up martial arts at the age of 13 and became the Israeli karate champion for her age group. At 17, she switched to boxing at the urging of her coach, Raanan Tal. Between 2009 and 2012, she was managed by Hezi Shayb.
In 2012, she started training with a new coach named Lior David.

Boxing career
Finer first won the WIBF bantamweight title in a match against Ukrainian boxer Oksana Romanova which was held in Germany on October 10, 2009. Finer won by a technical knockout in the sixth round.

This match was preceded by several attempts to win the world championship title in different weight categories, one of which being veteran German boxer Regina Halmich's farewell fight on November 30, 2007.

On April 29, 2010 Finer retained her title after defeating the Armenian boxer Agnesse Boza, whom she knocked out a minute before the end of the fifth round. The match took place in the Nokia Arena in Tel Aviv.

On October 30, 2010 Finer defended her title again against German boxer Julia Sahin in a match that was held in Ontario, Canada. The match was ten rounds long and was won by umpire decision.

On January 22, 2011 Finer defeated French boxer Nadege Szikora in a match that was held in France, thus retaining her title for the third time.

On July 14, 2012 Finer defended her title for the fourth time, this time in Munich, Germany. She defeated Austrian boxer Bettina Granasi by a knockout in the third round.

Professional boxing record

See also
Sport in Israel
List of select Jewish boxers

References

1984 births
Living people
Jewish boxers
Israeli women boxers
Israeli Jews
People from Tel Aviv
Israeli female karateka
World boxing champions
Bantamweight boxers